Robert E. Zahren (July 21, 1926 – April 27, 2013) was an American football player and coach. He served as the head football coach at Loras College in Dubuque, Iowa from 1958 to 1959.

References

External links
 

1926 births
2013 deaths
Loras Duhawks football coaches
Loras Duhawks football players
High school football coaches in Iowa
Sportspeople from Chicago
Players of American football from Chicago